The Tokwe River is a river in southeastern Zimbabwe. It is a tributary of the Runde River and its major tributaries include the Tokwane River.

the river is also known as Tugwi

Rivers of Zimbabwe
Save River (Africa)